"SMPTE 344M" is a standard published by SMPTE which expands upon SMPTE 259M allowing for bit-rates of 540 Mbit/s, allowing EDTV resolutions of 480p and 576p.

This standard is part of a family of standards that define a serial digital interface.

References

Film and video technology
SMPTE standards